Swaershoek Pass (literally: Brother-in-law's Corner Pass) is a gravel road in the Eastern Cape province of South Africa, on the regional road R337, between Cradock, Eastern Cape and Pearston.

The gravel pass reaches an altitude of 1981 metres above sea level with maximum gradient of 1:12.

Mountain passes of the Eastern Cape